Friends House is a multi-use building at 173 Euston Road in Euston, central London, that houses the central offices of British Quakers. The building is also the principal venue for North West London Meeting and the Britain Yearly Meeting.

In November 2014, a major refurbishment of the Large Meeting House was completed and the hall is commercially marketed as "The Light".

Meeting rooms at Friends House are named after prominent Quakers and peace campaigners, including Bayard Rustin, Lucretia Mott, John Woolman, Ada Salter, Waldo Williams, George Bradshaw, Kathleen Lonsdale, Abraham Darby, Hilda Clark, Marjorie Sykes, Margaret and Sarah Fell, Benjamin Lay, Elizabeth Fry and George Fox. 

Also at the site, for public use, there are restaurant, coffee bar, bookshop and a quiet area for personal meditation and worship.

References

External links

Quakerism in England
Quakerism in London
Grade II listed buildings in the London Borough of Camden
Quaker meeting houses in London